Mikael Lindholm (born 19 December 1964) is a Swedish former professional ice hockey player who played for the Los Angeles Kings in the National Hockey League. His son Elias Lindholm is a professional ice hockey player and was selected by the Carolina Hurricanes in the 1st round (5th overall) of the 2013 NHL Entry Draft. Mikael is also the uncle of Calgary Flames' centre, Calle Järnkrok.

Career statistics

References

External links
 

1964 births
Living people
Brynäs IF players
Hannover Scorpions players
Los Angeles Kings draft picks
Los Angeles Kings players
Luleå HF players
Malmö Redhawks players
New Haven Nighthawks players
People from Gävle
Phoenix Roadrunners (IHL) players
Swedish ice hockey centres
Sportspeople from Gävleborg County